Dve Mogili is a Bulgarian football club from the town of Dve Mogili. Until 2008, the name of the club was Filip Totyu. They play their home matches at Filip Totyu stadium with a capacity of 800 seats, and its team colors are white and green. The club currently participates in the regional football groups. Their biggest success to date is reaching the Bulgarian Amateur Cup final twice: in 2010 and in 2012.

Current squad

References

External links 
 Club info on Dve Mogili Municipality's website

Association football clubs established in 2008
Football clubs in Bulgaria
2008 establishments in Bulgaria